James McKay (11 June 1918 – 14 November 1986) was a Scottish footballer who played as a centre forward.

McKay joined Celtic from the army in September 1944 during World War II after serving in Burma with The Cameronians. He made a scoring debut on 7 October as Celtic lost 3–2 to Rangers in the Glasgow Cup at Hampden Park. He played a total of three Regional League games for Celtic – scoring two goals – before asking to be released in March 1945. McKay later joined Alloa Athletic, and also went on to play for Portadown, Cowdenbeath and, in the 1949–50 season, Tranmere Rovers.

References

1918 births
1986 deaths
Footballers from Stirling
Association football forwards
Scottish footballers
Celtic F.C. players
Alloa Athletic F.C. players
Portadown F.C. players
Cowdenbeath F.C. players
Tranmere Rovers F.C. players
Scottish Football League players
English Football League players
British Army personnel of World War II
Cameronians soldiers